Feroz Nizami (born Ferozuddin Ahmad; 10 November 1910 – 15 November 1975), was a Pakistani film score composer, music director and classical singer. He composed music for bollywood films in British India and after partition, he remained actively involved in Pakistan film industry. He is primarily recognized as a music composer for a music blockbuster Indian film Jugnu (1947), which helped him to appear among the prominent composers in both India and Pakistan cinemas. His last composition in Bombay films was released in 1947, leading him to retain his position for more than twenty years in  South Asia's music industry during the 1940s. Before he returned to Pakistan while working in Indian films, he was referred to as "Ustad of Bombay" by the Indian artists such as Lata Mangeshkar, Mohammed Rafi, and Dilip Kumar.

During his last days, he extensively researched music and wrote books on the musical subject such as Ramooz e Moseeqi and Israr e Moseeqi, and an autobiographical book titled Sarchashma e Hayat, comprising a detailed account of his life. He is also credited for introducing the greatest Indian singer Mohammed Rafi to the Indian film industry.

Early life and education
He was born on 10 November 1910 in British India (in modern-day Lahore, Pakistan). Feroz Nizami received his education from the Government Islamia College, and later graduated from a government college. He also studied Sufism and Metaphysics. He was the brother of a Pakistani cricketer Nazar Mohammad and writer Siraj Nizami. His was married to an Indian-born woman Ghulam Fatima. In 2016, his wife argued that she submitted multiple requests to the government of Pakistan, including provincial government of  Punjab for financial assistance, she according to The Express Tribune is living in one rental room in Jogi Mohalla area of Bhatti Chowk, Lahore, and was not assisted by the authorities. Following the claimed difficult circumstances, she is believed to return her hometown Bhendi Bazaar, India.

Feroz Nizami was originally working as a singer at a state-owned radio station at Lahore and was later transferred to the All India Radio and eventually at Delhi and later in Lucknow until he went to Bombay (now Mumbai) in search of career opportunities in bollywood. While working at the radio station, he had the opportunity to work with such people as Saadat Hasan Manto, Krishan Chander and another music director Khwaja Khurshid Anwar.

Career 
Prior to his debut in Urdu and Hindi films, Feroz received his training in classical music from the classical music teacher Abdul Wahid Khan of the Kirana gharana. After completing his training, he left midway working for the All India Radio and went to Mumbai in bollywood film industry. He composed different types of music throughout his career, and used classical, semi-classical, thumris and western music in India (before partition) and in Pakistan (after partition). He originally started his career in 1943 with Vishwas film, in which he worked with Chhelalal, Indian music director. He then composed music in 1946 for Neik Parveen film, a flop film of that time, but some of its compositions were good. Later in 1947, Noor Jehan and her husband Shaukat Hussain Rizvi's production company Shaukat Art Productions (SAP) in Mumbai recruited him to score the music for SAP's first film Jugnu, a music blockbuster film of 1940s.

After the partition, he migrated to Lahore and started working as a music director in Pakistani film industry with his first film Hamri Basti (1949), a flopped film. However, four years later, Noor Jehan produced the Pakistani film, Chann Vey, his compositions for the film were praised in the Indian subcontinent. In 1952, he scored music for Dopatta film, the only high-grossed Pakistani film of the 1950s.

Later work
During the late 1950s, he
used to teach classical music at the Alhamra Arts Council in Lahore, Pakistan.

Filmography

Literary work 
In addition to composing music, he also wrote books on art and music, including English-language books entitled ABC of Music and History and Development of Music, the only writings on the subject that were first written after the country became a sovereign state. In the later years, he wrote more books on the subject such as Ramooz e Moseeqi and Israr e Moseeqi. A book he wrote on spiritualism was Sarchashma e Hayat, comprising his autobiography.

Death
Feroze Nizami died on 15 November 1975 in Lahore, Pakistan. His death anniversary is observed by the Pakistanis every year, particularly in Lahore.

Bibliography

References

External links 
 

1910 births
1975 deaths
Hindi film score composers
Pakistani film score composers
Pakistani classical singers
Musicians from Lahore